The following is a list of events relating to television in Ireland from 1983.

Events
10 January – Satirical television programme Ballymagash premieres on RTÉ Television hosted by Frank Kelly.
11 September – The rural drama series Glenroe is first aired on RTÉ Television.
2 October – Murphy's Micro-Quiz-M is first aired. It is a quiz show which features the use of computers.
27 October – The International Council of the National Academy of Television Arts & Sciences of the United States presents Salute to Irish Television, an evening of RTÉ Television programmes, at the Lincoln Center in New York City.
29 October – The Late Late Show is broadcast live from New York.
24 November – Access Community Television, a series of programmes made by groups such as seminarians, young travellers and Garda trainees first goes on air.

Debuts

RTÉ 1
6 January – / The Irish R.M. (1983–1985)
10 January – Ballymagash (1983)
10 January – / The Coral Island (1983)
11 January –  Andy Robson (1982–1993)
17 January –  The New Adventures of Mighty Mouse and Heckle & Jeckle (1979–1980)
14 March –  Into the Labyrinth (1981–1982)
26 May –  Under the Mountain (1981)
21 July –  Come Midnight Monday (1982)
11 September – Glenroe (1983–2001)
1 November –  Pandamonium (1982)
9 November –  The Nargun and the Stars (1981)
Undated – Caught in a Free State (1983)
Undated –  The A-Team (1982–1987)

RTÉ 2
15 April –  Boys from the Blackstuff (1982)
21 April –  Breakpoint (1982)
16 November –  Manimal (1983)

Ongoing television programmes

1960s
RTÉ News: Nine O'Clock (1961–present)
RTÉ News: Six One (1962–present)
The Late Late Show (1962–present)

1970s
Sports Stadium (1973–1997)
Trom agus Éadrom (1975–1985)
The Late Late Toy Show (1975–present)
RTÉ News on Two (1978–2014)
Bosco (1979–1996)
The Sunday Game (1979–present)

1980s
Today Tonight (1982–1992)
Mailbag (1982–1996)

Ending this year
28 March – Ballymagash (1983)
Unknown - Caught in a Free State (1983)

Births
19 June – Aidan Turner, actor

See also
1983 in Ireland

References

 
1980s in Irish television